Continental Tire the Americas, LLC, d.b.a. General Tire, is an American manufacturer of tires for motor vehicles. Founded in 1915 in Akron, Ohio by William Francis O'Neil, Winfred E. Fouse, Charles J. Jahant, Robert Iredell, & H.B. Pushee as The General Tire & Rubber Company (also referred to as The General Tire & Rubber Co. and starting in the 1960's as simply General Tire) using funding from Michael O'Neil, William Francis' father, who owned Akron's O'Neil's department store. The company later diversified by 1984 into a conglomerate (GenCorp) with holdings in tires (General Tire), rubber compounds (DiversiTech General), rocketry and aeronautics (Aerojet), entertainment and news (RKO General), and real estate. The tire division was sold to Germany's Continental in 1987, becoming Continental Tire North America, before its re-incorporation again to its current name. The compounds division was spun off & became OMNOVA Solutions. The rocketry business was kept and expanded, and after a couple company name changes, the parent company is now Aerojet Rocketdyne Holdings.

History

Formation 
William Francis O'Neil had a Firestone franchise in Kansas City. He started a small manufacturing facility for tire repair products, and called it The Western Rubber & Supply Company initially, then The Western Tire & Rubber Company.

As Firestone grew, it sold additional franchises, reducing the territories of its earlier franchisees. Dissatisfied, O'Neil decided to compete with Firestone instead, using the expertise he had gained with Western Tire and Rubber. He went into partnership with four other men, using funding gained from his father, and formed The General Tire & Rubber Company in 1915 using $200,000 in capital borrowed from the store. O'Neil & his associates hired away some Firestone managers.

Initially, they focused on repair materials, as with Western Tire & Rubber, but in 1916 they expanded into tire manufacturing, focusing on high-end products. Early products included:
 General Jumbo, a premium replacement for Ford Model T trucks
 Low-pressure General Balloon Jumbo
 Dual 90 tires

Growth 
Despite the difficult business climate of World War I, in 1917, O'Neil established a dealership network and began an advertising campaign. By 1930, the company had 14 retail stores and about 1.8% of the tire market. During the depression, as competitors failed, The General Tire & Rubber Company bought out Yale Tire and Rubber, and India Tire and Rubber. By 1933, it had increased market share to 2.7%. This was a relatively large number, considering that the company limited its product line.

Conglomeration

Radio, television, and film 
Because the Depression was particularly hard on manufacturing, The General Tire & Rubber Company bought several Ohio radio stations on which it advertised. In 1943, it diversified the core business strategy, purchasing the Yankee Network and the radio stations it owned from Boston's Shepard Stores, Inc. Thomas F. O'Neil, son of the founder William F. O'Neil, served as Yankee's chairman with Shepard's John Shepard III serving as president.

The company continued its move into broadcasting by acquiring the Don Lee Broadcasting System, a well-respected regional radio network on the West Coast, in 1950.  Among other stations, it added KHJ-AM-FM in Los Angeles and KFRC-AM-FM in San Francisco to its stable from the Yankee acquisition. In 1952, it bought WOR/WOR-FM/WOR-TV in New York City and merged its broadcasting interests into a new division, General Teleradio (purchased from R. H. Macy & Company alongside WOR & Bamberger Broadcasting; named as a result of The General Tire & Rubber Company's increased investment in WOR). RKO/General also added Canadian 50,000 watt power house CKLW in Windsor to the family. The "Big 80" was #1 in the Detroit market.

The company's final move into entertainment was the acquisition of RKO Radio Pictures from Howard Hughes in 1955 for $25 million. The General Tire & Rubber Company was interested mainly in using the RKO film library to program its television stations, so it sold the RKO lot at Sunset and Gower in Hollywood to Lucille Ball and Desi Arnaz's Desilu Productions in 1956 for $6 million. The remaining assets of RKO were merged with General Teleradio, and the new company became known initially as RKO Teleradio Pictures, then RKO Teleradio, before eventually becoming RKO General.  The radio stations became some of the leading broadcasters in the world, but the division was dragged down by unethical conduct at its television stations.  This culminated in the longest licensing dispute in television history, eventually forcing RKO General out of the broadcasting business by 1991.

Rocketry 

In the late 1930s, the United States Army became interested in rockets. A group of California Institute of Technology engineers won a contract to produce rocket engines to speed airplane liftoff, and formed a company named Aerojet. The group succeeded with liquid-fuel rockets, but needed additional materials science and manufacturing expertise to create more sophisticated solid-fuel rockets. Aerojet went into partnership with The General Tire & Rubber Company, using their capitalization, expertise with rubber binders, and chemical manufacturing facilities. The partnership was renamed Aerojet-General.

Marketing 
In its advertising in the 1970s and '80s, General Tire's slogan was: "Sooner or later, you'll own Generals."

The current advertising campaign is "Anywhere is Possible."

The brand sponsors Major League Fishing since before 2016.

Motorsports 

General Tire is the official tire supplier of the ARCA Menards Series since 2016, previously it did the same at the NASCAR Whelen Euro Series in 2019 and 2020. The brand also sponsors the Best in the Desert and the Jeep Jamboree. The brand sponsored off-road driver BJ Baldwin from 2009 to 2019.

Reorganization 
General Tire re-incorporated itself to General Tire, Inc. & reorganized its holdings into the holding company GenCorp, Inc. in 1984, with General Tire and RKO General as subsidiaries.

GenCorp sold General Tire to German tire maker Continental AG in 1987. General Tire still exists today as part of Continental's American operations.

References

External links 

 General Tire website
 General Tire Moldova
 General Tire Club

Continental AG
Aerojet Rocketdyne Holdings
Tire manufacturers of the United States
Defunct automotive companies of the United States
Companies based in Akron, Ohio
Defunct manufacturing companies based in Ohio
American companies established in 1915
Automotive companies established in 1915
Manufacturing companies disestablished in 1987
1915 establishments in Ohio
1987 disestablishments in Ohio
1987 mergers and acquisitions